Reşadiye is a town in Tokat Province, Turkey.

Reşadiye may also refer to

Places in Turkey
Reşadiye, Çivril, Denizli Province
Reşadiye, Ortaköy, Aksaray Province
Reşadiye, Sandıklı, Afyonkarahisar Province
Reşadiye, Tarsus, Mersin Province
Reşadiye, Yenişehir, Bursa Province
Reşadiye, Yenice, Çanakkale Province 
Reşadiye, an area of Datça in Muğla Province
Reşadiye, an Ottoman name for Igoumenitsa

Other uses
Reşadiye Peninsula, in south west Turkey
Reşadiye-class battleship
Ottoman battleship Reşadiye